Żychlin is a town in Łódź Voivodeship (central Poland).

Żychlin may also refer to the following places:
Żychlin, Piotrków County in Łódź Voivodeship
Żychlin, Greater Poland Voivodeship (west-central Poland)
Żychlin, Pleszew County in Greater Poland Voivodeship
Żychlin, Pomeranian Voivodeship (north Poland)